Justice Bobbitt may refer to:

Arch Bobbitt, associate justice of the Indiana Supreme Court
William H. Bobbitt, chief justice of the North Carolina Supreme Court